Motive(s) or The Motive(s) may refer to:
 Motive (law)

Film and television
 Motives (film), a 2004 thriller
 The Motive (film), 2017
 Motive (TV series), a 2013 Canadian TV series
 The Motive (TV series), a 2020 Israeli TV series
 "The Motive", a 1958 episode of Alfred Hitchcock Presents

Music
 Motive (album), a 1990 album by Red Box
 "Motive" (song), a 2020 song by Ariana Grande and Doja Cat
 "The Motive" (song), a 1987 song by Then Jerico

Other uses
 Motive (algebraic geometry)
 Motive, Inc, a software manufacturer
 Motive Studios, a video game company

See also
 Motif (disambiguation)
 Motivation (disambiguation)